Alder Creek flows into Beaver Kill by Turnwood, New York.

References

Rivers of New York (state)
Rivers of Ulster County, New York
Tributaries of the East Branch Delaware River